In mathematics, a mirabolic subgroup of the general linear group GLn(k) is  a subgroup consisting of automorphisms fixing a given non-zero vector in kn. The image of a mirabolic subgroup in the projective general linear group is a parabolic subgroup consisting of all elements fixing a given point of projective space. The word "mirabolic" is a portmanteau of  "miraculous parabolic". As an algebraic group, a mirabolic subgroup is the semidirect product of a vector space with its group of automorphisms, and such groups are called mirabolic groups. The mirabolic subgroup is used to define the Kirillov model of a representation of the general linear group. 

References

Linear algebraic groups